The brown-winged parrotbill (Sinosuthora brunnea) is a parrotbill often placed with the Old World babblers (family Timaliidae) or in the Sylviidae, but it actually seems to belong to the distinct family Paradoxornithidae.

It is found in China and Myanmar.

Subspecies
S. b. ricketti: south Sichuan and north Yunnan (China). Sometimes treated as a separate species, the Yunnan parrotbill 
S. b. styani: Dali of Yunnan (China). 
S. b. brunnea: central-east Myanmar and north Yunnan (China).

References

Further reading
Robson, C. (2007). Family Paradoxornithidae (Parrotbills) pp.  292–321 in; del Hoyo, J., Elliott, A. & Christie, D.A. eds. Handbook of the Birds of the World, Vol. 12. Picathartes to Tits and Chickadees. Lynx Edicions, Barcelona.

brown-winged parrotbill
Birds of Yunnan
Birds of Myanmar
brown-winged parrotbill
Taxonomy articles created by Polbot